Jorge Ignacio González Barón (born 22 December 1983 in Trinidad, Flores Department), is a Uruguayan footballer currently playing for Zamora in the Venezuelan Primera División.

External links
  (archive)
 
 

1983 births
Living people
People from Flores Department
Uruguayan footballers
Uruguayan expatriate footballers
Liverpool F.C. (Montevideo) players
Sportivo Cerrito players
Defensor Sporting players
Chacarita Juniors footballers
San Martín de San Juan footballers
Talleres de Córdoba footballers
El Tanque Sisley players
Deportivo La Guaira players
Universitario de Sucre footballers
Club Atlético Mitre footballers
Centro Atlético Fénix players
Zamora FC players
Primera Nacional players
Uruguayan Primera División players
Venezuelan Primera División players
Torneo Federal A players
Association football defenders
Uruguayan expatriate sportspeople in Argentina
Uruguayan expatriate sportspeople in Bolivia
Uruguayan expatriate sportspeople in Venezuela
Expatriate footballers in Argentina
Expatriate footballers in Bolivia
Expatriate footballers in Venezuela